Graham Holroyd (born 25 October 1975) is an English rugby league and rugby union footballer who played for Halifax and Oldham RLFC (Heritage № 1295) as a . He re-joined Halifax after a two-year spell with Swinton. He won the Championship with Halifax in 2010, beating Featherstone Rovers 23–22.

Representative career
In 1998, he played for Emerging England in a 15–12 victory over Wales. He had been named in the Ireland training squad for the 2008 Rugby League World Cup but was not included in the final side due to a knee injury sustained in training.

Rugby union career

Although Graham spent most of his career playing rugby league he did spend several seasons playing rugby union at northern clubs Halifax (2002–03) and Preston Grasshoppers (2011–12).

References

External links
 
Ireland profile
 
 
 

1975 births
Living people
English people of Irish descent
English rugby league players
Doncaster R.L.F.C. players
Halifax R.L.F.C. players
Huddersfield Giants players
Leeds Rhinos players
Oldham R.L.F.C. players
Preston Grasshoppers R.F.C. players
Rugby league five-eighths
Rugby league players from Halifax, West Yorkshire
Salford Red Devils players
Alumni of Durham University
British & Irish Lions rugby union players from England
Durham University RFC players
English rugby union players
People educated at Bradford Grammar School
Rugby union fly-halves
Rugby union players from Halifax, West Yorkshire
Sale Sharks players
Swinton Lions players